Hagerman was a rail station stop in Hagerman, New York along the Montauk Branch. It first opened around October 1890, and though little more than a small shack, it was the site of a former experimental electric-powered monorail line. It was later razed and discontinued as a station stop in 1929. It was located between the Patchogue and Bellport stations.

References

External links
1925 image of Hagerman LIRR station, by James V. Osborne (TrainsAreFun.com)
East Patchogue Monorail (South Country Retired Teachers Association)

Former Long Island Rail Road stations in Suffolk County, New York
Railway stations in the United States opened in 1890
Railway stations closed in 1929
1890 establishments in New York (state)
1929 disestablishments in New York (state)